The Kia Naimo is an electric subcompact crossover SUV concept revealed by South Korean automobile manufacturer Kia at the 2011 Seoul Motor Show.

Overview

The Kia Naimo concept was first revealed at the Seoul Motor Show on March 31, 2011 in Seoul, South Korea. It is a 5-door all-electric subcompact crossover SUV. Its name 'Naimo' is derived from ne-mo meaning "square shaped" in Korean, referring to its overall design. The concept's design is inspired by Asian celadon pottery, which are also glazed in the same celadon color used on the car.

Specifications

Technical specs
The battery used in the Kia Naimo is a twin-pack 27 kWh lithium-ion polymer battery located under the boot floor, powered by a 107 hp electric motor. A quick charge system can fill the batter up to 80% in 25 minutes.

Exterior
Among its celadon-inspired design on the exterior, the Naimo concept features an asymmetrical sunroof, dot-style LED headlights, an illuminated Kia logo on the rear, suicide doors, and other square-shaped accents.

The car lacks traditional side-view mirrors and windshield wipers, and instead has cameras and air-drying jettisons replacing them respectively.

Interior
The interior of the Naimo has four seats, which are colored yellow and white, and door panels with wood accents to continued the handcrafted theme present on the exterior. Each row features central touchscreen control panels.

References

Concept cars
Kia concept vehicles
Crossover sport utility vehicles